Mark A Whalon (1886–1956) was an Irish-American author.  Whalon was a close friend of Bill Wilson, founder of Alcoholics Anonymous, and said to be a close influence on Wilson in his later life.

Published works

Rural Peace (LCCN: 33019932) is a 1933 book of poetry about the carefree, hardships, reality, difficult truths of daily life in East Dorset, Vermont.

The poem, Lem, is a poem about a poor, lonely, and hardworking farmer, misunderstood and judged by the tiny community—not so 'carefree a life described in that poem (more or a 'Rural Postal Carrier understanding the plight of a rural patron).

The poem, Fickle Spring, a "delight," a taste of the optimistic, charming and ever "charmer" of a hopeless 'romantic in the poet, Mark A. Whalon!

The poem, Day Dreamer, is a favorite, 'written to his son, Lawrence John Whalon. Mark delves into a portrait of his son's childhood and future life:

Day Dreamer

Dream on, day-dreamer boy of mine,
Unmindful, you, of worldly things.
With distant eyes and ears attuned
to catch the rustle of fairy wings.
Heed not my scolding petulance:
Anathemas in envy hurled
Recalling you from golden realms
And offering you—my sordid world.
Forgive me, son; I too, once dreamed,
Young dreams I dreamed the same as you
but lost the power to dream again—Because, you see, my dream came true.
Dream on: achievement, honors, glory, strife
Are but mere incidents.--To dream—is life.

'to Lawrence John Whalon, 1923 - 1986

Amazing acuity, perception, written by Mark A Whalon to his son when he was only eleven (1934), one is astounded at the sensitivity, the awareness of his own parenting short-comings, yet of his love and devotion to his son, then his accurate portrayal of his son's panoramic future and life—and, now in retrospect, the outline and almost prophetic quality of the poem itself:

'achievement, honors, glory, strife....

Rural free delivery; recollections of a rural mailman is a 1942 autobiographical where Whalon writes about growing up and living in East Dorset.

References
Cheever, Susan. My Name Is Bill: Bill Wilson--His Life and the Creation of Alcoholics Anonymous (Smon & Schuster), 2004, 
Whalon, Mark. "Rural peace." United States Library of Congress.  1933.  23 JUN. 2011.  
Whalon, Mark. "Rural free delivery; recollections of a rural mailman." United States Library of Congress.  1942.  23 JUN. 2011.

External links
Jon Mathewson on poet Mark Whalon, Dorset Historical Society, via YouTube

1886 births
1956 deaths
American male poets
20th-century American poets
20th-century American male writers